Little Bridge (5 November 2006 - 5 March 2014) was a racehorse originating from New Zealand. He is best known as the winner of the 2012 Sprinting Champion in Hong Kong and the Winner of the 2012 King's Stand Stakes at Royal Ascot.

Background
Little Bridge is a gelding born in 2006 between Faltaat and Golden Rose. He was trained by Hong Kong trainer Danny Shum. Little Bridge began racing in Hong Kong in the 09/10 season. He won his very first race. In the 2012 King's Stand Stakes, Little Bridge was placed in draw 7 with jockey Zac Purton. With his win he became the first New Zealand horse to win a group 1 race at Royal Ascot.

Little Bridge has a record of 10 wins out of 22 races. He retired early in the 2013 season and was sent to Australia. He died on 5 March 2014 due to a bout of colic.

References 

http://racing.scmp.com/freeservice/news/news20140310d.asp
http://www.theguardian.com/sport/2012/jun/18/royal-ascot-tuesday-horse-racing-tips
http://royal-ascot.racingpost.com/news/horse-racing/royal-ascot-kings-stand-little-bridge-scores-international-success/1056152/
http://www.nzb.co.nz/news.cfm?content_id=165317

2006 racehorse births
2014 racehorse deaths
Racehorses bred in New Zealand
Racehorses trained in Hong Kong
Thoroughbred family 23

zh:小橋流水